Sang Thong ('golden conch') or The Prince of the Golden Conch Shell is a Southeast Asian folktale inspired from the Paññāsa Jātaka, a non-canonical collection of stories of the Buddha's past lives. In its Thai version, it tells the story of a prince who acquires a golden countenance, dons a disguise, marries a princess and saves the kingdom of his father-in-law. It is an "archetypal story of an abducted maiden and the struggle to regain her, in this case, against her wishes", which has many equivalents in countries influenced by Theravada Buddhism.

Summary
King Yotsawimon has two wives, the first named Chantathevi, the second Suwanchampa. She gives birth to a snail shell. His second wife conspires to banish her rival and her son from the palace.

Mother and son are expelled from the kingdom and take refuge with an old couple. His mother breaks his snail shell. He departs and is taken in by a giantess. One day, he jumps into a golden well and his body acquires a gilded appearance. He takes the treasures of giantess: a mask, a pair of flying shoes and a double-edged knife. He disguises himself with "an ugly mask" and calls himself Chao Ngo. (in other accounts, the mask is said to be of the Ngor people or a Negrito, and he is described as having black skin).

(In another Thai version, the prince escapes with the treasures from his adoptive mother, named Panturat, who dies of a broken heart).

His next stop is the Samon Kingdom, ruled by Thao Samon. He marries the seventh daughter of King Samon, named Rodjana (Nang Rochana), who sees his through the disguise, but everyone else sees him as an ugly person. The king banishes his daughter after their marriage to a house in the rice fields.

In order to test the his seven sons-in-law's mettle, he asks them to hunt a stag in the forest. The brothers-in-law ride to the forest, while Sang Thong takes off his disguise, shows his golden skin and attracts every stag to himself. Sang Thong's brothers-in-law see that the mysterious golden-skinned man has the wild animals all around him, and ask him to share some with them. Sang Thong agrees to let his brothers-in-law have some of the animals, in exchange for them cutting off a piece of their earlobes. Next, the king orders them to bring him a hundred fishes. The brothers-in-law go to catch the fishes for their king. Sang Thong, in his golden appearance, has summoned all the fishes from the river, and his brothers-in-law meet him and ask for some of his catch. Just like before, Sang Thong agrees to let them have the fishes, as long as they cut off a part of their noses.

At the end, Indra challenges the Samon Kingdom. Prince Sangthong takes off his disguise, assumes his true form and defeats Indra at a game. The king of Samon acknowledges him as his son-in-law and gives him the kingdom.

In an epilogue to the story, his real mother goes to the Samon Kingdom, now ruled by Sang Thong, and works as a cook. She inscribes their joint history in a gourd and the king recognizes his mother.

Development
The earliest written version of the folktale appears as the Suvarna-Sangkha Jataka story in the Paññāsa Jātaka, a non-canonical collection of stories of the Buddha's past lives (jataka tales) written in Pali and compiled around the 15th–16th centuries in Chiang Mai, now in northern Thailand. Prior to then, the story was probably part of the oral tradition in the areas of present-day Thailand and its neighbouring countries. The tale was adapted into the lakhon nok play format, and extant fragments dating to the late Ayutthaya period (late 17th century – 1767) are known. The best known written version is that of the lakhon nok attributed to King Rama II.

The tale continues to enjoy popularity in Thailand, being one of the best known folktales and a prime example of the chak chak wong wong genre of stories. It appears in a wide range of media forms, is depicted in murals of Wat Phra Singh in Chiang Mai, and has been adapted for various modern literature and popular media.

Spread
Variants of the tale are found across Thailand's neighbouring countries in Southeast Asia. According to James R. Brandon, Fern Ingersoll finds many literary treatments of the tale of Sang Thong across this region.

Burma
In another version of tale, titled The Snail Prince and sourced from Burma, the queen gives birth to a snail, to her husband's horror. He orders the queen to be demoted to a lowly station and to throw the snail in the river. The snail is saved by an ogress (or ogress queen) and becomes a human boy. When he becomes a youth, the ogress gives him a cloak that turns him into a hunchback, to disguise his appearance; a magic cane and sends him to a human kingdom. He works as a cowherd in the city. When the youngest daughter of this city's king wants to marry, she throws a garland of flowers that falls on the now human snail prince. They marry. His father-in-law sets a task for his sons-in-law, and the hunchbacked youth accomplishes it. He reveals his true appearance as a golden prince and succeeds his father-in-law.

In a Burmese tale from the Palaung people, "Принц-улитка" ("Prince-Snail"), a king has seven queens. One night, the first queen has a strange dream she interprets as a sign she will soon become pregnant. Nine months later, she gives birth to a snail shell. The king casts the shell into the water, and the river washes it away to distant margins. A childless old couple finds the shell and takes it home. A youth comes out of the shell, does the chores and returns to it, after the couple goes to work. The old man discovers the youth and adopts him. One day, the snail youth finds human remains under the couple's house, and escapes by using a pair of magical shoes the couple owned. He flies to a distant kingdom. He dons a disguise as a poor man and goes to a celebration, where the princess is throwing flower garlands at her prospective husband. A garland falls on his neck and he marries the princess.

Cambodia: Saing Selchey
The tale of the Golden Prince in the Conch Shell also appears as an ancient theatrical form in Cambodian literature known as sastra lbaeng, with the name Sang Selachey or Saing Selchey ("Conch Shell Prince"). According to scholars of Khmer classical literature, the tale was written in Khmer by Oknha Vongsa Thipadei Ouk in 1887. In the 1930s, Saing Selchey was "one of the most popular bassac plots" in Cambodia. First in 1962 and 1966 with 6000 exemplaries, the Buddhist Institute transcribed the sastra and printed a new copy of Saing Selchey. In 1986 Minister of Culture Chheng Phon sponsored a special performance of Saing Selchey as part of his effort to promote the cultural renaissance of Cambodia after the devastation caused by the Khmer Rouge. Since the 1990s, NGOs have adapted the form to spread information about AIDS, sex trafficking and domestic violence. In the 1999, Saing Selchey was played on stage again starring acots such as Chek Mach and attracting thousand of spectators.

Malaysia: Anak Raja Gondang 
The tale of the Golden Prince in the Conch Shell is performed in Malaysia as a type of mak yong, by the name of Anak Raja Gondang ("The Prince of the Golden Conch Shell").

Mubin Sheppard provided the summary of a second version of the tale, which was performed in Kelantan. In this version, Sang Thong is the actual son of an ogress, born with black skin and a tiny black wand with magical powers he carries in his hand. The ogress dies and he goes to live in the forest. When six young princesses come to bathe in the lake, he falls in love with the youngest, and the spirit of his mother appears in his dreams to help him win the princess as his wife. She returns to life in the shape of a tiger to menace the kingdom. Sang Thong uses his magical wand to kill the tiger and resurrect the people the animal killed. He marries the princess and lives as a black-skinned man by day, and as a man with a glistening skin like gold at night.

Laos: Sinxay
In a Laotian tale translated into Russian with the title Золотая улитка (Zolotaya ulitka; "Golden Snail"), a king has no sons, until his wife Chanthewi gives birth to a snail. One one of the king's courtiers, a devious man, interpret the birth as a bad omen and recommends the queen is banished. She is banished with the golden snail shell and takes shelter with a poor old couple. One day, the queen leaves home with the old couple, and, when they return, the food is made and the house is tidy. Chanthewi decides to discover the mysterious housekeeper: she pretends to leave and hides behind the house; a youth comes out of the snail shell to clean the house. Chanthewi cracks the snail shell; the youth recognizes her as his mother and is named Sang Thoong. Back at the palace, the devious courtier learns of the youth and lies to the king that he is an evil spirit. The king orders his execution and, after the executioner's axe is useless against Sang Thoong, ties a rock to his feet and throws him into the river. However, Sang Thoong is saved by a beautiful, but evil sorceress named Phanthurak, who welcomes him as son. One day, Phanthurak has to go on a journey, and tells Sang Thoong not to sneak into her belongings. After she leaves, the youth opens a door and sees human skulls and bones; he opens a chest and finds a jug with golden water; another with silver water, a spear and shoes. He dips his finger into the just with the golden liquid and it turns gold; he wears the shoes and discovers they can fly. The next day Phanthurak leaves, Sang Thoong drops the golden liquid on himself, steals the spear and shoes and flies away beyond the mountains. When Phanthurak returns, she discovers her things were stolen by the boy and tries to follow him, but stops at the foot of the mountain, since she has no magic equipment to climb it. Feeling that she is dying, Phanthurak inscribes into a stone a spell to learn the language of the birds as her last words. Sang Thoong descends the mountain and reads the inscriptions. With a newfound mastery of magic, he disguises himself as a mad man named Chau Ngo and goes to another kingdom. In this kingdom, the king's six elder daughters are already married, save for the seventh, Rochana. One day, the king summons all men to the courtyard for Rochana to choose her suitor, among them Chau Ngo. Princess Rochana goes to Chau Ngo and, instead of a mad man in shabby appearance, sees a golden youth. She puts a garland of flowers around his neck and announces her decision. Believing that his daughter made a poor choice, the king banishes his daughter to a humble hut, but Rochana cannot be happier. One day, Sang Thoong is taken by his brothers-in-law to take part in a hunt. The six brothers-in-law cannot find any good game, but see Sang Thoong surround by animals of the forest and ask if he can share some with them. Sang Thoong agrees to share, if they cut a part of their nostrils in return. The next time, they take Sang Thoong on a fishing trip. The same bad luck assails them, until Sang Thoong agrees to share some of his catches in return for them cutting their earlobes. The third time, war erupts near the kingdom, and princess Rochana tells that her father is summoning Sang Thoong to join in the fray to protect her kingdom. Sang Thoong rides a horse and uses the stolen spear from Phanthurak to defeat the enemy army. Rochana's father thinks that the warrior came from the Heavens, but his daughter Rochana explains it is her husband. At the end of the tale, Sang Thoong finds his mother Chanthewi and reconciles with his father.

See also
Thai folklore
Thai literature
The Snail Son (Japanese folktale)
The Turtle Prince (folktale)
The Magician's Horse
The Black Colt
The Story of the Prince and His Horse
Iron John
Keong Emas (Golden Snail, Javanese folktale)
Ureongi gaksi (The Snail Bride, Korean folktale)

References

Further reading
 Rama II; Ingersoll, Fern S.; Sukhphun, Bunson. Sang thong a dance-drama from Thailand. Rutland, Vt., C.E. Tuttle Co. [1973]
 Saeng-Arunchalaemsuk, Suprawee (2018). “พระสังข์ : การผจญภัยของวีรบุรุษ (Phra Sang: The Hero’s Journey)”. In: วารสารมนุษยศาสตร์และสังคมศาสตร์ มหาวิทยาลัยราชภัฏสุราษฎร์ธานี (Journal of Humanities and Social Sciences, SRU) 10 (2): 185-206. https://e-journal.sru.ac.th/index.php/jhsc/article/view/889. (In Thai)
 Watcharaporn Distapan (2002). The Sang Thong tale type: Its popularity and reproduction. Thesis of Master's of Arts. Bangkok: Chulalongkorn University. (In Thai)

External links
 บทละครนอกเรื่องสังข์ทอง, full text of the King Rama II edition at the Vajariyana Digital Library 

Thai folklore
Thai literature
Shapeshifting